Highfield House is a high-rise condominium in the Tuscany-Canterbury neighborhood of Baltimore, Maryland, United States.  It was designed by Mies van der Rohe and completed in 1964. It was the second of two buildings designed by Mies in Baltimore. One Charles Center was the first.

Highfield House was added to the National Register of Historic Places in 2007.

Highfield House was featured in The Baltimore Modernism Project held at the D Center Baltimore in October 2012. The Baltimore Modernism Project included renderings from the archives of the Baltimore Architecture Foundation, alongside a rendering and drawings on loan from the Highfield House Board, and contemporary photography by Jeremy Kargon. In October 2014, Highfield House celebrated its 50th anniversary by revealing a new plaque noting its addition to the National Register of Historic Places.

Architecture
Highfield House is a 15-story concrete tower facing east. Set on a platform, the main residential floors are 20 feet above the base. 36 columns frame an enclosed lobby and two equally sized areas of sheltered terrace to the north and south. The windows are made of dark gray tinted glass. Below each window is a brick panel. The use of brick decoration can also be seen in his buildings at IIT.

References

External links
Engineer's Guide to Baltimore: Highfield House Condominiums
Highfield House Condominiums 50th anniversary website, 2014
, including photo from 2001, at Maryland Historical Trust
Highfield House – Explore Baltimore Heritage

Apartment buildings in Baltimore
Ludwig Mies van der Rohe buildings
Residential condominiums in the United States
Tuscany-Canterbury, Baltimore
Buildings and structures completed in 1964
Residential buildings on the National Register of Historic Places in Baltimore
1960s architecture in the United States
Modernist architecture in Maryland
Residential skyscrapers in Baltimore